Paulo Xisto Pinto Júnior (born 30 April 1969) is a Brazilian musician best known as the bassist for heavy metal band Sepultura. He joined Sepultura after Roberto Raffan left the band in 1984, becoming Sepultura's second bassist. Although no original members are left in Sepultura, Pinto is the longest remaining member of Sepultura despite never performing on any album until Chaos A.D. (1993).

Early life and influences 
Paulo Jr. was born in Belo Horizonte, where he grew up with two brothers and a younger sister. His father was a lawyer. He received his first bass guitar, a white Giannini, when he was 15. In an interview, Paulo Jr. commended his parents for supporting the band in its early days.  

His influences include Steve Harris, Geddy Lee, Geezer Butler, Cliff Burton and Gene Simmons, though Paulo plays bass with a guitar pick rather than his fingers.

Career

Sepultura

In 1984, Paulo Jr. met the Cavalera brothers in the Santa Teresa neighbourhood of Belo Horizonte through a common friend. He joined Sepultura after the departure of the band's previous bass player, Roberto Raffan. Paulo Jr. played his first concert at  the Ideal Club in Santa Teresa. He is their longest serving member. However, while he was a part of the band in their early years and performed live with them, Paulo had not performed on any Sepultura album until Chaos A.D. (1993); Andreas Kisser did both guitar and bass duties on their albums prior to Chaos A.D., except Morbid Visions (1986), which featured Jairo Guedz handling both roles.

The Unabomber Files
In 2009, Paulo Jr. joined with Alan Wallace and André Márcio of Eminence and Vladimir Korg of Chakal to form the band The Unabomber Files. In 2013, the group released a six-song EP and a teaser for the music video of the song "Buried In My Bunker".

Guest appearances
In 2007, Paulo Jr. played bass guitar on Sayowa's second album. In 2013, he made a guest appearance on Eminence's fourth album, The Stalker, providing extra bass accompaniment.

Personal life
Paulo Jr.'s hobbies include jiu jitsu and football. He is an avid supporter of football club Clube Atlético Mineiro. He currently lives in São Paulo.

Charity work
Since 1999, Paulo Jr. has organised a series of annual football charity games between former Brazilian players, television artists, musicians and the band members. The games took place at the Estádio Municipal Castor Cifuentes in Nova Lima, Brazil, near Belo Horizonte. The spectators were asked to donate a pound of food and the gathered donations were given to local charities.

In April 2008, Paulo Jr. was decorated with the Medalha da Inconfidência. This decoration was created in 1952 by the former Brazilian president Juscelino Kubitschek to pay homage to individuals who contributed in the development of the state of Minas Gerais and the country. The ceremony took place in Ouro Preto, hosted by the then Governor of Minas Gerais, Aécio Neves.

Discography

Sepultura 
 1985: Bestial Devastation
 1986: Morbid Visions
 1987: Schizophrenia
 1989: Beneath the Remains
 1991: Arise
 1993: Chaos A.D.
 1996: Roots
 1998: Against
 2001: Nation
 2002: Revolusongs
 2003: Roorback
 2006: Dante XXI
 2009: A-Lex
 2011: Kairos
 2013: The Mediator Between Head and Hands Must Be the Heart
 2017: Machine Messiah
 2020: Quadra

The Unabomber Files 
 2013: The Unabomber Files

Guest appearances
Eminence
 2013: The Stalker

References

1969 births
Living people
Sepultura members
Brazilian heavy metal bass guitarists
Male bass guitarists
Brazilian people of Portuguese descent
Musicians from Minas Gerais
People from Belo Horizonte